Majid Khan (born 3 December 1989) is a Pakistani cricketer who plays for Federally Administered Tribal Areas. He made his first-class debut on 16 November 2015 in the 2015–16 Quaid-e-Azam Trophy.

References

External links
 

1989 births
Living people
Pakistani cricketers
Federally Administered Tribal Areas cricketers
Cricketers from Peshawar